The Seven Stars Luxury Hospitality and Lifestyle Awards (abbreviated SSLHLA; also simply referred to as the Seven Star Awards) are a series of annual awards presented to international recipients in the hospitality industry. They were created by Khalil El-Mouelhy in 2013.

The awardees are selected by a panel of judges with extensive experience in the luxury hospitality and lifestyle industry. Panelists have included Ece Vahapoğlu, Nichole de Carle, Massimiliano della Torre e Tasso (the son of Carlo Alessandro, 3rd Duke of Castel Duino), and other well-known public figures.

Similar industry awards include the World Travel Awards, which Seven Star Awards founder Khalil El-Mouelhy was the director of.

Overview
Since 2013, the awards have been held annually at various locations in Southern Europe and Southeast Asia. Each year, there are generally about a dozen categories, over 200 winners, and approximately 1,000 nominees on average.

The Signum Virtutis, the Seal of Excellence is one of the most prestigious annual awards offered by SSLHLA, while the SSLHLA Pantheon of Hospitality is awarded to those who have received at least five Signum Virtutis awards.

History

2019
Tony Elumelu won The Seven Stars Man of The Year award in 2019.

In 2019, Valentine Ozigbo received The Seven Stars Hospitality Personality of The Year award.

Kensho Psarou won the Special Award of Lifestyle Boutique Hotel & Villas during the 7th International Ceremony of Seven Stars Awards on October 5, 2019.

2018
Winners in 2018 came from Nigeria, Indonesia (including Bali), Fiji, Cyprus, Greece, Mauritius, Maldives, Turkey, Russia, Tanzania (including Zanzibar), South Africa, Switzerland, Italy, Germany, and Austria. Prince Massimiliano della Torre e Tasso, Baroness Nerina Keeley, Greek celebrity Nina Lotsari, Carmen Edelson, Thanos Liontos, Amani Vernescu, photographer Oliver Jiszda, Miriam Seferian, and Andrea Luri were among the luxury panel members of the Seven Stars Luxury Hospitality and Lifestyle Awards for 2018.

Maldives won the Seven Stars Destination Award in 2018, coming ahead of Dubai, Seychelles, Mauritius, and Singapore. Maldives also won the Signum Virtutis, the Seal of Excellence, for the third time, after winning in the same category in 2013 and 2014.

Oman Air won the Best Airline in The Middle East, Africa and Europe award in 2018.

Out of the Blue, Capsis Elite Resort in Crete won the Seven Stars Luxury Hospitality and Lifestyle Awards for 2018. The resort won the Signum Virtutis for Seven Star Best Hotel & Resort in Greece for the second consecutive year, and also won the Seven Star Best Spa Services award.

Luxury Greece DMC & Travel won the Seven Stars Luxury DMC award in 2018.

2017
The award panelists in 2017 included Massimiliano della Torre e Tasso (the son of Carlo Alessandro, 3rd Duke of Castel Duino), Ece Vahapoğlu, HRH Nathalie Princess of Hohenzollern, and other well-known figures.

Deer Jet was selected by the Luxury Panel of the Seven Stars Luxury Hospitality and Lifestyle Awards to receive the 2017 Seven Star Private Jet Company Special Award. The Luxury Panel members included HSH Prince Massimiliano della Torre e Tasso, Khalil El-Mouelhy, and Ece Vahapoğlu.

2016
Qatar Airways won the Seven Star First Class Lounge Award for 2016.

Valentine Ozigbo received the Seven Stars CEO of the Year Award in 2016.

The Maharajas' Express, owned and operated by the Indian Railway Catering and Tourism Corporation (IRCTC), received the 2016 Seven Stars Luxury Hospitality and Lifestyle Awards at Marbella, Spain in the Seven Star Experience Sector.

In 2016 and 2019, Regine Sixt won the Seven Star Woman of The Year award.

References

External links

Annual events
Awards established in 2013
Hospitality industry awards
Recurring events established in 2013